The following highways are numbered 382:

Canada
Newfoundland and Labrador Route 382
 Quebec Route 382

Japan
 Japan National Route 382

United States
  Arkansas Highway 382
  Arkansas Highway 382 Spur
  Georgia State Route 382
  Louisiana Highway 382
  Maryland Route 382
  New York State Route 382 (former)
 Ohio State Route 382 (former)
  Pennsylvania Route 382
  Puerto Rico Highway 382
  South Carolina Highway 382 (former)
  Tennessee State Route 382
  Virginia State Route 382